The Confederation Life Building, a seven-floor Romanesque Revival office building, is a historic structure in Toronto, Ontario, Canada. Completed in 1892, it was designated a historic property by the City of Toronto under the Ontario Heritage Act on November 26, 1975.

It is located at 2–14 Richmond Street East on the north side of Richmond Street East, extending from Yonge Street to Victoria Street. 

The building was once home to insurer Confederation Life, which launched a competition for designs for its new headquarters in May 1889. The winning entry came from architects Wilm Knox and John Elliot, whose firm Knox, Elliot and Jarvis had only been operating for a few years when it won design rights for the building.

A fire gutted the top floor of the building and destroyed the roof in June 1981, but the structure survived and was restored for new tenants occupying the primary address at 20 Richmond Street East, with secondary addresses at 157 Yonge and 106 Victoria.

Notes

Sources

External links 

Confederation Life Building at the Ontario Heritage Trust

1892 establishments in Ontario
Buildings and structures completed in 1892
Buildings and structures in Toronto
City of Toronto Heritage Properties
Designated heritage properties in Ontario